Sharafat Chhod Di Main Ne is a 1976 Bollywood film directed by Jagdev Bhambri. The film stars Feroz Khan, Hema Malini, Neetu Singh in pivotal roles. The music was composed by Madan Mohan.

Cast
Feroz Khan as Raju / Rai Sahib
Hema Malini as Preeta / Geeta (Double Role) 
Neetu Singh as Radha
Helen as Dancer / Singer
Bindu as Dancer / Singer  
Padma Khanna as Dancer / Singer 
Faryal as Dancer / Singer  
Jayshree T. as Dancer / Singer
Laxmi Chhaya as Dancer / Singer

Plot
Raju and Preetha are in love. But he is disappointed when she marries another man due to pressure from her father. Raju can't take the betrayal and treats every woman as a play thing. Raju moves to the city and befriends Kalu who introduces him to Rai Sahab who runs illegal activities. Rai Sahab soon becomes fond of Raju. Preeta passes away after giving birth to her daughter Radha. Rai Sahab hands his empire to Raju and bestows on him the title Rai Sahab.

Years pass by. Preetha's daughter Radha is now a college student in love with her classmate. She lives with her aunt Geeta, who is Preetha's lookalike and runs an ashram for unwed pregnant girls. At a fund-raising show for Geeta's ashram, Radha performs a dance which her mother used to perform in the village. Raju, a generous donor of the ashram, is in the audience and is flooded by memories. And he gets attracted to the much younger Radha.

Soundtrack
Music composed by Madan Mohan, while all song lyrics are written by Verma Malik.

External links
 

1976 films
1970s Hindi-language films
Films scored by Madan Mohan